The 2018–19 New Mexico State Aggies men's basketball team represents New Mexico State University during the 2018–19 NCAA Division I men's basketball season. The Aggies, led by second-year head coach Chris Jans, play their home games at the Pan American Center in Las Cruces, New Mexico as members of the Western Athletic Conference. They finished the regular season 27–4 and 15–1 in WAC play to win the WAC regular season championship. In the WAC tournament, they defeated Chicago State, Texas–Rio Grande Valley, and Grand Canyon to become WAC Tournament champions. They received the WAC's automatic bid to the NCAA tournament, where they lost in the first round to Auburn. They also set a school record for wins in a season and won 30 games for the first time in team history.

Previous season 
The Aggies finished the 2017–18 season 28–6, 12–2 in WAC play to win the WAC regular season championship. In the WAC tournament, they defeated Chicago State, Seattle, and Grand Canyon to become WAC Tournament champions. They received the WAC's automatic bid to the NCAA tournament where they lost in the first round to Clemson.

Roster

Schedule and results
Source:

|-
!colspan=9 style=| Regular season

|-
!colspan=9 style=| WAC tournament

|-
!colspan=12 style=| NCAA tournament

References

New Mexico State Aggies men's basketball seasons
New Mexico State
New Mexico State Aggies men's basketball
New Mexico State Aggies men's basketball
New Mexico State